Margaret Murray MBE (1921 – 2015), was a British music educator and musician. Together with Gunild Keetman, she produced a "seminal" English-language version of Carl Orff's Orff-Schulwerk in 1957.

Publications
 Wee Willie Winkie, and seven other songs using three and four notes with easy accompaniments, 1965
 Eighteen pieces for descant recorder and Orff-instruments, 1966
 Nine carols, 1973

References

1921 births
2015 deaths
British music educators
Women music educators